Mehmet Cevat Abbas Gürer (1887 – July 4, 1943) was an officer of the Ottoman Army, the Turkish Army, and a politician of the Republic of Turkey.

Works
Ebedi Şef Kurtarıcı Atatürk'ün Zengin Tarihinden Bir Kaç Yaprak, İstanbul Halk Basımevi, İstanbul, 1939.

Medals and decorations
Medal of Independence with Red-Green Ribbon

See also
List of recipients of the Medal of Independence with Red-Green Ribbon (Turkey)

Sources

External links

1887 births
1943 deaths
Military personnel from Niš
Monastir Military High School alumni
Ottoman Military Academy alumni
Ottoman Army officers
Ottoman military personnel of World War I
Committee of Union and Progress politicians
Members of Kuva-yi Milliye
Republican People's Party (Turkey) politicians
Turkish Army officers
Turkish military personnel of the Turkish War of Independence
Turkish military personnel of the Greco-Turkish War (1919–1922)
Deputies of Bolu
Recipients of the Medal of Independence with Red-Green Ribbon (Turkey)